Sonningdale is a hamlet in Rural Municipality of Eagle Creek No. 376, Saskatchewan, Canada. The hamlet with a population of less than 50 people as of January 2010. School students are bused to the nearby town of Maymont, which is about 20 kilometers north. Sonningdale has a church, post office, community complex, seniors centre, a library, and a firehall. The two story school had an enrollment of 33 in 2005, and was closed in June 2006. Two relocatable classrooms were move away in 2009.

Notable people
 Darren Hill: A Saskatoon City Councillor first elected in 2006.  He is up for reelection November 2020.  Darren has been a board/executive member of Saskatchewan Urban Municipalities Association (SUMA) since 2007.  He has also been a board member/standing policy committee member of the Federation of Canadian Municipalities (FCM)  since 2007.  Darren was elected as Third Vice President of FCM in Quebec City June 2019, and will be running for Second VP of FCM in 2020. Darren was a member of the FCM National Task Force on Syrian Refugee Resettlement.  He is currently a member of the FCM Western Economic Solutions Task Force (WEST).  Darren was the first ever male Vice-Chair of the FCM National Policy Committee on Increasing Women's Participation in Municipal Politics.  A role that he was reappointed to for a second term.
 Murray Farnell: Television, Film, Voice, and Stage actor, with appearances on Wynonna Earp, Hell on Wheels, Futurecard Buddyfight X, and Cardfight Vanguard.

References

Eagle Creek No. 376, Saskatchewan
Unincorporated communities in Saskatchewan